Saaremaa Harbour (Estonian: Saaremaa Sadam) is a deepwater harbour on the north coast of the Estonian island of Saaremaa. With a natural depth of 10 metres, the two quays are capable of serving the largest cruise ships sailing in the Baltic Sea. There is also a floating berth for small vessels.

The harbour is located in the village of Ninase near Küdema Bay. It was completed in 2006 and is owned by the Port of Tallinn.

In its first ten years of operation Saaremaa Harbour accommodated 30 different cruise ships, owned by 19 cruise companies. In 2016 only two cruise ships called at the harbour. It was reported that the Port of Tallinn wanted the harbour to develop into a multifunctional port and start servicing more cargo ships. In 2018 Saarte Hääl wrote of Saaremaa Harbour: "There is no longer any talk of profitability."

References 

Ports and harbours of Estonia